The 14th Annual Latin Grammy Awards was held on Thursday, November 21, 2013, at the Mandalay Bay Events Center in Las Vegas. This was the sixth time that Latin Grammys has been held at this location. The main telecast was broadcast on Univision at 8:00 PM EST.

The nominations were announced on September 25, 2013. Javier Garza, Illya Kuryaki and the Valderramas and Carlos Vives led the nominations with five nods each. Miguel Bosé was honored as the Latin Recording Academy Person of the Year on November 20, the day prior to the Latin Grammy Awards.

Carlos Vives was the biggest winner with three awards, including Song of the Year for "Volví a Nacer"; Marc Anthony won Record of the Year for "Vivir Mi Vida"; Draco Rosa won the award for Album of the Year for Vida; and Gaby Moreno was awarded Best New Artist. This marks the first time since the inaugural awards that the three categories were given to three different artists.  Producer Sergio George won three awards, including Producer of the Year.

Awards
The following is a list of nominees:

General
Record of the Year

Marc Anthony — "Vivir Mi Vida"
 Pablo Alborán — "Tanto"
 Concha Buika — "La Nave del Olvido"
 Andrés Cepeda — "Lo Mejor Que Hay En Mi Vida"
 Natalie Cole featuring Juan Luis Guerra — "Bachata Rosa"
 Santiago Cruz — "Desde Lejos"
 Draco Rosa featuring Ricky Martin — "Más y Más"
 Alejandro Sanz — "Mi Marciana"
 Caetano Veloso — "Um Abraçaço"
 Carlos Vives — "Volví a Nacer"

Album of the Year

Draco Rosa — Vida
 Pablo Alborán — Tanto
 Bajofondo — Presente
 Miguel Bosé — Papitwo
 Andrés Cepeda — Lo Mejor Que Hay En Mi Vida
 Natalie Cole — Natalie Cole en Español
 Guaco — Escultura
 Gian Marco — Versiones
 Alejandro Sanz — La Música No Se Toca
 Carlos Vives — Corazón Profundo

Song of the Year

Andrés Castro and Carlos Vives — "Volví a Nacer"
 Roberto Carlos — "Esse Cara Sou Eu"
 José Luis Pardo — "La Que Me Gusta" (Los Amigos Invisibles)
 Mario Domm, Hanna Huerta & Jesse & Joy — "Llorar"
 Amaury Gutiérrez — "Lo Mejor Que Hay En Mi Vida" (Andrés Cepeda)
 Alejandro Sanz — "Mi Marciana"
 Ricardo Arjona — "Mi Novia Se Me Está Poniendo Vieja"
 Jorge Luis Piloto — "Si Yo Fuera Tú" (Gilberto Santa Rosa)
 Aleks Syntek — "Sólo El Amor Nos Salvará" (Aleks Syntek Featuring Malú)
 Caetano Veloso — "Um Abraçaço"

Best New Artist

Gaby Moreno
 A Band of Bitches
 Leslie Cartaya
 EliaCim
 Clarice Falcão
 Jesús Hidalgo
 Maluma
 Mojito Lite
 Quattro
 Milton Salcedo

Pop
Best Contemporary Pop Vocal Album

Alejandro Sanz — La Música No Se Toca
Miguel Bosé — Papitwo
Draco Rosa — Vida
Aleks Syntek — Syntek
Julieta Venegas — Los Momentos

Best Traditional Pop Vocal Album

Andrés Cepeda — Lo Mejor Que Hay En Mi Vida
Pablo Alborán — Tanto
Natalie Cole — Natalie Cole en Español
India Martínez — Otras Verdades
Ricardo Montaner — Viajero Frecuente

Urban
Best Urban Performance

Pitbull featuring Papayo — "Echa Pa'lla (Manos Pa'rriba)"
Alexis & Fido — "Rompe la Cintura"
Elvis Crespo featuring Fito Blanko — "Pegaíto Suavecito"
Illya Kuryaki and the Valderramas — "Amor"
Mala Rodríguez — "Quien Manda"

Best Urban Music Album

Mala Rodríguez — Bruja
Daddy Yankee — Prestige
Ivy Queen — Musa
Tito El Bambino — Invicto
Wisin & Yandel — Líderes

Best Urban Song

Illya Kuryaki and the Valderramas — "Ula Ula"
Dj Buddah, Papayo, Pitbull, Gregor Salto & Tzvetin Todorov, Pitbull — "Echa Pa'lla (Manos Pa'rriba)"
Daddy Yankee, Eliezer Palacios, Giancarlo Rivera, Jonathan Rivera and Francisco Saldaña — "Limbo"
Clément Dumoulin and Mala Rodríguez — "Quien Manda"
Jorge Drexler, Andrés Mujica Celis and Ana Tijoux — "Sacar la Voz"

Rock
Best Rock Album

La Vida Bohème — Será
 Eruca Sativa — Blanco
Los Bunkers — La Velocidad de la Luz
No Te Va Gustar — El Calor del Pleno Invierno
Ska-P — 99%

Best Pop/Rock Album

Beto Cuevas — Transformación
Black Guayaba — La Conexión
DLD — Primario
Tan Biónica — Destinología
Tren A Marte — Tercera Llamada
Vicentico — Vicentico 5

Best Rock Song

Cachorro López and Vicentico — "Creo Que Me Enamoré"
Emiliano Brancciari — "A las Nueve" (No Te Va Gustar)
Erik Canales — "16" (Allison)
Henry D'Arthenay — "Hornos de Cal" (La Vida Bohème)
DLD — "Todo Cuenta"

Alternative
Best Alternative Music Album

Natalia Lafourcade — Mujer Divina – Homenaje a Agustín Lara
Bomba Estéreo — Elegancia Tropical
Café Tacuba — El Objeto Antes Llamado Disco
Illya Kuryaki and the Valderramas — Chances
Leon Larregui — Solstis

Best Alternative Song

Bajofondo — "Pena En Mi Corazón"
Leon Larregui — "Brillas"
Hello Seahorse! — "La Flotadera"
Illya Kuryaki and the Valderramas — "Monta El Trueno"
Sig Ragga — "Pensando"

Tropical
Best Salsa Album

Various Artists — Sergio George Presents: Salsa Giants
Albita — Una Mujer Que Canta
Guayacán — 25 Años, 25 Éxitos, 25 Artistas
Víctor Manuelle — Me Llamaré Tuyo
Tito Nieves — Que Seas Feliz
Gilberto Santa Rosa — Gilberto Santa Rosa

Best Cumbia/Vallenato Album

Felipe Peláez and Manuel Julián — Differente
Daniel Calderón y Los Gigantes — El Show Máximo Nivel
Silvestre Dangond — La 9a Batalla
Kvrass — Irreverente
Jorge Oñate — El Chaco de La Película

Best Contemporary Tropical Album

Juan Luis Guerra — Asondeguerra Tour
Leslie Grace — Leslie Grace
Guaco — Escultura
Toby Love — Amor Total
Vocal Song — Amarle

Best Traditional Tropical Album

Arturo Sandoval — Un Siglo De Pasión
Lucy Fabery and Humberto Ramírez — Sentimentales
Miriam Ramos with Barbarito Torres, Ernán Lopez-Nussa and Rolando Luna — La Canción Cubana
Septeto Nacional Ignacio Piñeiro — La Habana Tiene Su Son
Septeto Santiaguero — Vamos Pa' La Fiesta

Best Tropical Fusion Album

Carlos Vives — Corazón Profundo
Casadiego — Obsesiónate
Grupo Treo — Pégate
Palmacoco — Boogaflow
Tecupae — Suerte

Best Tropical Song

Andrés Castro and Carlos Vives — "Volví a Nacer"
Yoel Henríquez and Amerika Jiménez — "No Soy Un Hombre Malo" (Héctor Acosta "El Torito")
Sergio George and Jorge Luis Piloto — "Para Celebrar" (Various Artists)
Jorge Luis Piloto — "Si Yo Fuera Tú" (Gilberto Santa Rosa)
Víctor Víctor — "Y Yo Dejándola"

Singer-songwriter
Best Singer-Songwriter Album

Caetano Veloso — Abraçaço
Andrea Echeverri — Ruiseñora
Kany García — Kany García
Tommy Torres — 12 Historias
Yordano — Sueños Clandestinos

Regional Mexican
Best Ranchero Album

Vicente Fernández — Hoy
Vikki Carr — Viva la Vida
Aida Cuevas — Totalmente Juan Gabriel
Mariachi Sol de México de José Hernández con La Sinfónica de Las Américas — La Música
Sheyla Tadeo — Amémonos Homenaje A Lucha Villa

Best Banda Album

Banda Los Recoditos — El Free 
La Original Banda El Limón de Salvador Lizárraga — La Original y Sus Boleros de Amor
Banda Carnaval — Las Vueltas de La Vida
Cuisillos de Arturo Macias — 2012 Fin y Principio de Una Era
El Dasa — Pá La Raza
La Addictiva Banda de San José Mesillas — Muchas Gracias

Best Tejano Album

David Lee Garza — Just Friends
Shaggy García y Grupo Recuerdo — Solo Tencha
Los Texmaniacs — Texas Towns & Tex-Mex Sounds
Jay Perez — New Horizons
Siggno — El Mundo Se Acabó

Best Norteño Album

Intocable — En Peligro de Extinción
Los Canarios De Michoacán — Hoy y Siempre
Emilio Navaira — A Las Personas de Mi Vida
Pesado — Mi Promesa
Voz de Mando — Y Ahora Resulta

Best Regional Song

Pedro Fernández — "Cachito de Cielo"
Horacio Palencia — "Mi Razón De Ser" (Banda Sinaloense Ms de Sergio Lizárraga)
Manuel Eduardo Toscano — "Romeo Y Su Nieta" (Paquita la del Barrio)
Luis Carlos Monroy, Adrián Pieragostino and Alex Rodríguez — "Todo y Nada" (Los Canarios de Michoacán)
Adalberto Gallegos — "Tu Última Canción" (Jay Perez)

Instrumental
Best Instrumental Album

Bajofondo — Presente
Huáscar Barradas and Leopoldo Betancourt — Dos Mundos 2
Hamilton de Holanda — Trio
Paquito D'Rivera and Sérgio Assad & Odair Assad — Dances From The New World
Theodore Kuchar conducting The Orquesta Sinfónica de Venezuela — Latin American Classics

Traditional
Best Folk Album

Reynaldo Armas — El Caballo de Oro
Gaêlica — Luz - Una Navidad Celta En Venezuela
Gualberto Ibarreto and C4 Trío — Gualberto + C4
Los Nocheros — Clásicos - El Pecado Original
María Mulata — De Cantos Y Vuelos
Chuchito Valdés and Eddy Navia — Carnaval En Piano Charango

Best Tango Album

Diego El Cigala — Romance de la Luna Tucumana
Julio Botti — Tango Nostalgias
Hernán Lucero — Tangos y Canciones Criollas
Ramírez-Satorre — Piazzolla de Cámara
Pablo Ziegler and Metropole Orkest — Amsterdam Meets New Tango

Best Flamenco Album

Tomatito — Soy Flamenco
Vicente Amigo — Tierra
Argentina — Un Viaje Por El Cante
José Mercé — Mi Única Llave
Estrella Morente — Autorretrato
Miguel Poveda — Real

Jazz
Best Latin Jazz Album

Michel Camilo — What's Up?
The Clare Fischer Latin Jazz Big Band — ¡Ritmo!
Negroni's Trio — On the Way
 Poncho Sanchez and His Latin Jazz Band — Live in Hollywood
Chucho Valdés and the Afro-Cuban Messengers — Border-Free
Chucho Valdés — Grand Piano Live

Christian
Best Spanish Christian Album

Alex Campos — Regreso A Ti
Daniel Calveti — Mi Refugio
Lilly Goodman — Amor Favor Gracia
Mónica — Encontré Su Amor
Marcos Vidal — Tu Nombre

Best Portuguese Christian Album

Kleber Lucas — Profeta Da Esperança
Eyshila — Jesus, O Brasil Te Adora
Anderson Freire — Raridade
Bruna Karla — Aceito O Teu Chamado
Padre Reginaldo Manzotti — Paz e Luz
Ministério Adoração e Vida — Herói

Brazilian
Best Brazilian Contemporary Pop Album

Seu Jorge — Músicas Para Churrasco Vol. 1 Ao Vivo
Ed Motta — Aor
Natiruts — Acústico
Adryana Ribeiro — Take It Easy My Brother Jorge
Skank — Ao Vivo: Rock in Rio
Ultraleve — Ultraleve

Best Brazilian Rock Album

Jota Quest — Ao Vivo: Rock in Rio
Nevilton — Sacode!
Nando Reis and Os Infernais — Sei
Vespas Mandarinas — Animal Nacional
Vowe — Nossa Verdade

Best Samba/Pagode Album

Alexandre Pires — Eletrosamba - Ao Vivo
Diogo Nogueira — Ao Vivo em Cuba
Zeca Pagodinho — Vida Que Segue
Various Artists — Sambabook Martinho da Vila 2
Dora Vergueiro — Dora Vergueiro

Best MPB Album

Maria Rita — Redescobrir - Ao Vivo
Gilberto Gil — Concerto de Cordas & Máquinas de Ritmo
Edu Lobo — Edu Lobo & Metropole Orkest
Various Artists — Herivelto Martins - 100 Anos
Jorge Vercillo — Luar de Sol - Ao Vivo no Ceará

Best Sertaneja Music Album

Victor & Leo — Ao Vivo em Floripa
João Bosco & Vinícius — A Festa
Jorge & Mateus — A Hora é Agora - Ao Vivo em Jurerê
Marcos & Belutti — Cores
Michel Teló — Sunset

Best Brazilian Roots Album

Various Artists — Salve Gonzagão 100 Anos
César Oliveira & Rogério Melo — Era Assim Naquele Tempo...!
Os Serranos — Os Serranos Interpretam Sucessos Gaúchos Vol. 3
Elba Ramalho — Vambora Lá Dançar
Various Artists — Sob o Olhar Januarense / O Velho Chico - Volume 1

Best Brazilian Song

Roberto Carlos — "Esse Cara Sou Eu"
Djavan — "Bangalô"
Gilberto Gil — "Eu Descobri"
Biquini Cavadão & Dudy — "Roda-Gigante"
Caetano Veloso — "Um Abraçaço"
Arlindo Cruz, Gegê d'Angola and Julinho Santos — "Vai Embora Tristeza"
Joelson Castro and Felipe Salles — "Vem Me Completar" (Bruna & Keyla)

Children's
Best Latin Children's Album

Lucky Díaz y La Familia Música — ¡Fantástico!
Atención Atención — Vamos A Bailar
Eslabones Kids — Vamos A Cantar
Karito — Estoy Feliz
Miami Lighthouse for the Blind — Four Magical Stories to Live

Classical
Best Classical Album

Nelson Freire — Brasileiro
José Serebrier and St. Michel Strings — Adagio
Elaine Ortiz Arándes, Rafael Dávila, Manolo González, Guido Lebrón, Ilca López and Gil René - Cofresí: Rafael Hernández
José Serebrier — Dvorák Symphonies 3 & 6
Mario Adnet — Um Olhar Sobre Villa-Lobos
Isaac Karabtchevsky — Heitor Villa-Lobos Symphony No. 6 'On the Outline of the Mountains of Brazil'; Symphony No. 7

Best Classical Contemporary Composition

Carlos Franzetti — "Zingaros"
Anderson Freire — "A Igreja Vem"
Rafael Piccolotto de Lima — "Abertura Jobiniana" (Jeremy Fox conducting the Orquesta Sinfónica Nacional de Costa Rica)
Gabriela Ortiz — "Elegía" (Southwest Chamber Music)
Leo Brouwer — "String Quartet # 5" (The Havana String Quartet)

Recording Package
Best Recording Package

Tonho Quinta-Feira and Fernando Young — Abraçaço (Caetano Veloso)
Filipe Costa and Mateus Sá — Abaporu (Laura Lopes)
Belén Mena — De Taitas y de Mamas (Various Artists)
The Welcome Branding Group — El Techo es el Suelo (Quiero Club)
Masa — Repeat After Me (Los Amigos Invisibles)

Production
Best Engineered Album

Edgar Barrera, Sebastian de Peyrecave, Javier Garza, Julio Reyes Copello and Mike Fuller — Kany García (Kany García)
Eduardo Sobral, Léo Guimarães, Roberto Jr., Luiz Carlos T Reis and Ricardo Dias — Barra Da Saia (Karyme Hass)
Carlos Campón, Ernesto García, Noah Georgeson, Demian Nava, Sebastían Schon, César Sogbe and José Blanco — Mujer Divina – Homenaje a Agustín Lara (Natalia Lafourcade)
Marcelo Sabóia and Carlos Freitas — Rua Dos Amores (Djavan)
Bori Alarcón, Sergio Delgado and Salomé Limón — Soy Flamenco (Tomatito)

Producer of the Year

Sergio George
Rafael Arcaute
Javier Limón
Julio Reyes Copello
Dan Warner

Music Video
Best Short Form Music Video

Alex Cuba — "Eres Tú"
Famasloop — "Más Cerquita"
Jotdog — "Corazón de Metal"
Illya Kuryaki and the Valderramas — "Ula Ula"
Leiva — "Vis A Vis"

Best Long Form Music Video

Natalia Lafourcade — Mujer Divina – Homenaje a Agustín Lara
Cartel de Santa — Me Atizo Macizo Tour
Fuerzabruta — Wayra Tour
Fito Páez — El Amor Después del Amor: 20 Años
Various Artists — Hecho Con Sabor a Puerto Rico

Special Merit Awards
The following is a list of special merit awards

Lifetime Achievement Awards
Oscar D'León
Juan Formell
Roberto Menescal
Totó La Momposina
Palito Ortega
Eddie Palmieri
Miguel Ríos

Trustees Award
Mario Kreutzberger "Don Francisco"
Pedro Ramírez Velázquez

Changes to award categories
A new category for Best Urban Performance was added to the Urban music field. The award is intended for commercially released singles or tracks of a newly recorded material within the urban music genre.

Performers
Intro — "Latin Grammy 2013"
Wisin — "Que Viva La Vida"
Jesse & Joy and Mario Domm — "Llorar"
Carlos Vives — "Volví a Nacer"
Leslie Grace — "Be My Baby"
Alejandro Sanz with Berklee College of Music Students — "La Musica No Se Toca"
Enrique Iglesias, India Martínez and Descemer Bueno — "Loco"
Draco Rosa and Ricky Martin — "Más y Más"
Pablo Alborán — "Tanto"
El Dasa — "Casi Perfecto"
Becky G and Maluma — "La Temperatura"
Paquita la del Barrio with Mariachi Sol de México de José Hernández — "Romeo y Su Nieta"
Marc Anthony — "Vivir Mi Vida"
Pitbull, El Cata and Enrique Iglesias — "Echa Pa'lla (Manos Pa'rriba) / Cotorra y Voli / I Like It"
Miguel Bosé with Laura Pausini / Juanes / Ricky Martin — "Te Amare / Nada Particular / Bambu / "Bandido"
Natalia Lafourcade — "Maria Bonita"
Gian Marco — "La Flor de la Canela"
Yandel — "Hasta Abajo"
Wisin & Yandel — "Algo Me Gusta de Ti"
Natalie Cole (and Nat King Cole in video footage) — "Acercate Mas"
Calibre 50 and Banda Carnaval — "Gente Batallosa"
Salsa Giants (Sergio George, Oscar D'León, Ismael Miranda, Willy Chirino, Tito Nieves, José Alberto "El Canario") — "Para Celebrar"

Presenters
Iván Sánchez and Roselyn Sánchez — presented Best Contemporary Pop Vocal Album
Gaby Moreno — presented Best Urban Performance
Luis Angel Franco, Génesis Rodríguez and Samuel Sarmiento — presented Best Tropical Fusion Album
Laura Pausini — presented Best New Artist
Ximena Navarrete and David Zepeda — presented Best Urban Song
Julieta Venegas and Alex Cuba — presented Song of the Year
Gabriela Isler and Illya Kuryaki and the Valderramas — presented Best Salsa Album
Mala Rodríguez and Syntek — presented Best Norteño Album
Carlos Santana and Juanes — presented Album of the Year
Ninel Conde — introduced Yandel
Don Francisco and Cote de Pablo — presented Record of the Year

References

External links
Official Site

Latin Grammy Awards
Latin Grammy Awards by year
Grammy Awards
Annual Latin Grammy Awards
Annual Latin Grammy Awards